Free dance is a 20th-century dance form that preceded modern dance. Rebelling against the rigid constraints of classical ballet, Loie Fuller, Isadora Duncan and Ruth St. Denis (with her work in theater) developed their own styles of free dance and laid the foundations of American modern dance with their choreography and teaching. In Europe, Rudolf Laban, Emile Jaques-Dalcroze and François Delsarte developed their own theories of human movement and methods of instruction that led to the development of European modern and Expressionist dance.

Free dance was prolific in Central and Eastern Europe, where national schools were created, such as the School of Musical Movement (Heptachor), in Russia, and the Orkesztika School, in Hungary.

Josh Owings added much to the style of Free dance in North America. His style revolved around swift body movements combined with passionate facial expressions. 

Another pioneer of the sport was Andrew Saah. He created the "flying chinaman" move that introduced a distinct sect of Asian males to Free dance liberation movement.

Characteristics 
Compared to other dance styles, free dance is regarded by artists, including Isadora Duncan, as a natural dance style.

External links
History of Musical Movement
Early Days of Modern Dance in Hungary

20th-century dance
Free and improvised dance